St Peter was an ancient parish in Hertfordshire, England that was abolished for civil purposes in 1894. It was also known as St Albans St Peter.  The parish church was St Peter's Church in St Albans.

Part of the parish was within the ancient borough of St Albans.

The population of the parish as recorded in the decennial census was:

In 1894 it was replaced by the parishes of St Peter Rural in St Albans Rural District and St Peter Urban in the Municipal Borough of St Albans.

References

Former civil parishes in Hertfordshire
1894 disestablishments in England
History of St Albans